Cathy Ann Turner (born April 10, 1962, in Rochester, New York) is an American short track speed skater, who won gold medals at the 1992 Winter Olympics and 1994 Winter Olympics.

Turner was the American short-track champion in 1979, but short-trak speed skating was not then an Olympic discipline, and in 1980 she left skating to pursue a career as a singer. She sang in bands, shows and then began writing her own songs. She became a studio singer and songwriter under the stage name Nikki Newland. After short-track was exhibited at the 1988 Winter Olympics she decided to return to the sport. " After nine years away from her sports, she resumed training. She qualified for the Albertville Olympics, where she won the 500-meter short track race and was a member of the silver medal-winning 3000-meter relay team.

Turner retired from competitive skating after the 1992 Games to star with the Ice Capades as a singer and skater in the "Made In America" tour, but then returned yet again for the 1994 Games. She won another gold in the 500 meters in a controversial race in which silver medalist Zhang Yanmei accused Turner of grabbing her leg as Turner passed her, however, the judges did not see it that way. Turner was disqualified from the 1000-meter race when accused of impeding a South Korean skater Kim So-hee in a heat. She took a bronze in the 3000-meter team relay. Turner then placed fifth in the 3000-meter relay at the 1998 Winter Olympics in Nagano.

Turner now lives in Parma, New York and works as a Database Administrator at Paychex Inc., a motivational speaker, and a product spokesperson. She has also been a skating commentator for ESPN. Turner holds a bachelor's degree in computer science from Northern Michigan University, and is a contributor to the book Awaken The Olympian Within, among others.

References

 Leigh Montville, "Fire on Ice", Sports Illustrated, March 7, 1994

External links
 US Olympic Committee profile
 Jim Kelley, "Turner out to clear her name", Sports Illustrated, Feb. 17, 1998
 Regina Marcazzo, "Cathy Turner Speaks Out for Mental Health", Networking magazine, Sept. 2000
 Cathy Turner self-profile, US Olympic Committee site
 Britannica Online article

Living people
1962 births
American female short track speed skaters
Olympic gold medalists for the United States in short track speed skating
Olympic silver medalists for the United States in short track speed skating
Olympic bronze medalists for the United States in short track speed skating
Short track speed skaters at the 1992 Winter Olympics
Short track speed skaters at the 1994 Winter Olympics
Short track speed skaters at the 1998 Winter Olympics
Medalists at the 1992 Winter Olympics
Medalists at the 1994 Winter Olympics
American color commentators
Northern Michigan University alumni
People from Parma, New York
Sportspeople from Rochester, New York
21st-century American women